Piraya Film is an independent production company based in Stavanger, Norway, known for making documentary films, often on international subjects. The company was founded in 1999 by filmmakers Torstein Grude and Trond Kvist with the aim of making creative high end documentaries for release in the market worldwide.

Funding
The production house has received funding for several projects from Filmkraft Rogaland, a Norwegian regional film center and FilmReg member.

Awards
Piraya (and/or its founders) has been nominated for multiple producer Oscars and Emmies, and have won several awards at film festivals worldwide.

The company has been commended for producing films focused on unconventional and dangerous territories, such as Sergei Magnitsky’s death, a decade-long sting operation in North Korea, Indonesian mass killings, and Russian-Georgian war.

Piraya was recognized with Fritt Ord Foundation's Tribute.

Productions
The company has produced 40+ films, which have received broad recognition and many nominations and awards. including multiple Oscar and Emmy nominations and Sundance wins.

Piraya Film is regularly involved in international co-productions.

References

External links
 Piraya Film official site
 Yodok Stories site
 Russian Lessons site
 Belarusian Waltz site

Mass media companies established in 1999
Film production companies of Norway